Die Gewehre der Frau Carrar was a 1953 East German live television production of the 1937 play Señora Carrar's Rifles by Bertolt Brecht.

External links
 

1953 films
1953 television plays
East German films
Television in East Germany
German television films
1950s German-language films
German-language television shows
Films based on works by Bertolt Brecht